The Texas Killing Fields is a 25-acre patch of land in League City, Texas situated a mile from Interstate Highway 45 and approximately 26 miles southeast of Houston. Since the early 1970s, 33 bodies of murder victims have been found along the I-45 area. They were mainly the bodies of girls or young women. Furthermore, many additional young girls have disappeared from this area; these girls' bodies are still missing.

It is believed that many of the murders are the work of multiple serial killers. Most of the victims were aged 12–25 years. Some shared similar physical features, such as similar hairstyles.
However, despite efforts by the League City, Texas police, along with the assistance of the FBI, very few of these murders have been solved, and those that have been solved were predicated on confessions given by prisoners, or confessions given under duress from the police. 

The fields have been described as "a perfect place [for] killing somebody and getting away with it". After visiting some of the sites of recovered bodies in League City, Ami Canaan Mann, director of the film Texas Killing Fields, commented: "You could actually see the refineries that are in the south end of League City. You could see the I-45. But if you yelled, no one would necessarily hear you. And if you ran, there wouldn't necessarily be anywhere to go." Also, despite the fact that many popular true crime podcasts have grouped the murders of Dean and Tina Clouse with these victims, Dean and Tina Clouse were actually found in Houston off Interstate 10 in the 13,000 block of Wallisville Road, not League City (the location of the Texas Killing Fields).

Victims

Suspects

Michael Lloyd Self

In 1972, a gas station operator and convicted sex offender from Galveston, Michael Lloyd Self, became a suspect in the murders of Rhonda Johnson and Sharon Shaw. After hours of interrogation, Self confessed to the murders. He was taken to the district prison, later aiding with locating the bodies. In the following months, he retracted his confession, claiming that he had been tortured into confessing, with the interrogators suffocating with a plastic bag, burning him with cigarette butts and a radiator, as well as being assaulted by the police chief, Don Morris. Nevertheless, on September 18, 1974, Self was convicted of killing Shaw and received a life imprisonment term, despite the fact that his confessions showed great discrepancies concerning the victims' clothing, the date of the murders, the locations of the bodies, how they were killed, and various other details.

Three years later, in 1976, Don Morris and his deputy, Tommy Deal, were arrested and convicted of various crimes, including torture and other misconduct against detainees. Morris was sentenced to 55 years, while Deal to 30. After this, Self regularly applied for an appeal, but was rejected every time.

Michael Self died on December 21, 2000, still in custody. It was only after his death that a number of police officials, including the former Harris County District Attorney, stated their belief that Self was wrongly convicted.

Edward Harold Bell

An investigation by the League City police and the FBI in the 1970s identified another local resident, Edward Harold Bell, a known exhibitionist, as a suspect. He had been arrested at least 12 times on charges of showing his genitals to children, but each time avoided imprisonment. Bell lived on a property near the beach in Galveston, where he was a silent partner of a surf shop. He even knew two of the victims, Debbie Ackerman and Maria Johnson, who frequented the store. In the mid-1970s, he acquired a plot of land in Dickinson and lived near the place where two more victims, Brooks Bracewell and Georgia Geer, were last seen alive. In 1978, Bell, while masturbating on the street in front of a group of teenage girls, he was confronted by 26-year-old former Marine Larry Dickens, while his mother called the police. Dickens removed the keys from Bell's vehicle and refused to return them. In retaliation, Edward killed him and fled, but was subsequently apprehended by police. He posted bail several weeks later and in order to avoid conviction and further incarceration, he fled Texas and escaped from the United States, evading police for more than two decades. In 1993, he was arrested in Panama and extradited back to the United States, where he was subsequently convicted of Dickens' murder and received a 70-year sentence. In 1998, Bell wrote several letters to the Harris County Attorney, confessing to the murders of five girls in 1971 and six more between 1974 and 1977. He stated that he did not remember the names of most of his victims, but confidently stated that he had killed Debbie Ackerman, Maria Johnson, Colette Wilson and Kimberly Pitchford, as well as two other then-unnamed girls whom he had abducted from Webster in August 1971, later identified as Rhonda Johnson and Sharon Shaw.

Despite this, Bell was never charged with these murders, since no evidence, biological or otherwise, incriminated him. He remained a prime suspect until his death in April 2019.

Mark Stallings
In 2013, Mark Roland Stallings, a convicted kidnapper serving a life term, confessed to killing a girl in 1991 and later dumping her body in the fields, later identified as Donna Prudhomme. At the time of the murder, Stallings was living and working in League City, and was near the homes of some of the girls who went missing and were later found dead. Despite the fact that his testimony shows great consistency with details, he hasn't been charged with any murders yet, but remains a suspect in the murders of Donna Prudhomme and Audrey Cook, as well as two unrelated murders in Fort Bend County.

Clyde Hedrick
Clyde Hedrick was named as a suspect in the 2022 documentary series Crime Scene: The Texas Killing Fields. Hedrick was released from jail in 2021 after serving eight years for the murder of Ellen Beason in 1984.  He once said he had murdered four to five women.

Convictions

Krystal Jean Baker case
In April 2012, 16 years after Krystal Jean Baker's beaten, raped and strangled body was found, Kevin Edison Smith was arrested and convicted of murdering her. In 2009, Smith had been arrested on a drug charge in Louisiana. At about the same time, a detective tested Baker's dress for DNA. A match was confirmed, using advanced technology that was not available at the time of Krystal's disappearance. A jury deliberated for about 30 minutes and found Smith guilty. He was sentenced to life in prison.

Shelley Sikes case
In 1987, 30-year-old John Robert King phoned the El Paso police, claiming that on May 24, 1986, he, together with 33-year-old Gerald Peter Zwarst, attacked Shelley Sikes while she was in her car, after which the girl was raped and strangled. After his arrest, Zwarst told the police that he had hidden the body in one of the fields, where the other bodies were found. Both men were asked to indicate the whereabouts of Sikes' body in exchange for avoiding life sentences, but their directions failed to uncover it. King and Zwarst were convicted of aggravated kidnapping, and received life imprisonment sentences in 1998. They were also probed for other such crimes committed during the mid-1980s, but both vehemently denied any involvement. King died from natural causes behind bars in October 2015, while Zwarst died in prison in November of 2020.

William Lewis Reece

In May 1997, William Lewis Reece was arrested for the kidnapping and attempted murder of 19-year-old Sandra Sapaugh from Webster. The following year, he was found guilty and convicted, receiving a 60-year imprisonment term. In 2015, his DNA was matched to the killer of 19-year-old Tiffany Johnston, who was found murdered in Oklahoma in 1997. After this revelation, Reece confessed to killing Jessica Lee Cain and Kelli Ann Cox, leading the investigators to the bodies' burial sites. He had been suspected of kidnapping and killing Laura Smither and confessed to Friendswood Police, in 2016, that he murdered her.

In 2021, Reece was convicted of Johnston's murder and sentenced to death. The following year, he was extradited to Texas and was convicted of the murders of Smither, Cain and Cox, receiving a life term after pleading guilty to each of the three murders.

Media adaptations

Texas Killing Fields (2011)
A film adaptation of the deadly events that occurred along the I-45 highway was released on September 9, 2011, with the title Texas Killing Fields.

It was directed by Ami Canaan Mann and starred Sam Worthington and Jeffrey Dean Morgan. The film is loosely based on the murders while depicting a fictional portrayal of the struggle that local police faced while attempting to solve the murders. The film focuses on the lead police detectives, Capt. Brian Goetschius and Mike Land, who dedicated their careers to solving the mysteries of I-45. The filmmakers hired officers Goetschius and Land as consultants while making the movie.

Screenwriter and Federal Agent Donald Ferrarone said he drew information from an interview with a kidnapping victim, Michelle Ann E. and the family of one of the murder victims.

Janet Miller, mother of victim Laura Miller, said in an interview with the Dallas Morning News that she was angry at first about the  film, stating "I was upset because no one notified me. The parents should know what's going on." Tim Miller, the father of Laura Miller, said he saw the film for what the filmmakers intended — to raise awareness about the crimes and to generate new tips.

In an interview with CBS News for 48 Hours, actor Sam Worthington said, "People — you never know — might just go and see the movie and go, 'Oh, I remember when someone went down in the fields, and I remember a certain car and a certain person seemed a bit dodgy.' Maybe a family can then know what happened to their daughter."

Crime Scene: The Texas Killing Fields (2022)
Crime Scene: The Texas Killing Fields, a three-part miniseries about the Texas Killing Fields, was released on Netflix in November 2022. The series was directed by Jessica Dimmock.

See also
 Gwynns Falls Leakin Park – notorious body dumping ground in Baltimore, Maryland

General:
 List of fugitives from justice who disappeared
 List of serial killers in the United States

References

Female murder victims
Formerly missing people
Fugitives
History of women in Texas
Murder in Texas
Serial murders in the United States
Unidentified murder victims in Texas
Unidentified American serial killers
Unsolved murders in the United States